The Lancia Delta S4 is a Group B rally car manufactured by the Italian car company Lancia. The Delta S4 competed in the World Rally Championship in 1985 and 1986, until Group B class was disbanded and the cars were eventually banned from competition completely by European sanctioning body FIA. The car replaced, and was an evolution of the 037. The S4 took full advantage of the Group B regulations, and featured a midship-mounted engine and all-wheel drive for superior traction on loose surfaces.

A total of 28 complete chassis were manufactured.

Specifications
The car's  Inline-four engine combined supercharging and turbocharging to reduce turbo lag at low engine speeds (rpm). The engine generated a maximum output of  but some sources even claim that the engine was capable of generating . The combined super/turbocharger system (often referred to as twincharging) was a development of the 037 engine that generated  with a supercharger only.

Like Peugeot's earlier 205 T16, the mid-engine Lancia Delta S4 was a silhouette race car (for marketing purposes), and shared virtually nothing in terms of construction with the production front-engine Delta. The chassis was a tubular space frame construction much like the 037. It featured long travel double wishbone suspension front and rear, with a single large coil over at the front along with a separate spring and twin shock absorbers at the rear. The bodywork was made of a carbon fibre composite with front and rear bodywork fully detachable for fast replacement due to accident damage, allowing ease of access during on-event servicing. The bodywork featured several aerodynamic aids including bonnet opening behind the front-mounted water radiator with Gurney flap, front splitter and winglets moulded into the front bumper panel, flexible front skirt, and rear deck lid wing that featured both a full aerofoil wind section twinned with a deflection spoiler. The door construction style was brought from the 037 with a hollow shell all-Kevlar construction that had no inner door skin, no door handle or window winder. The door was opened with a small loop and the windows were fixed perspex with small sliding panels to allow ventilation and passing of time cards.

The all-wheel drive system, developed in cooperation with English company Hewland, featured a centre differential which allowed for 60-75% of the torque to go to the rear wheels. The transmission was a 5-speed also developed by Hewland.

The Group S Lancia ECV was to replace the Delta S4 in the 1987 season but the Group S was scrapped along with Group B and Lancia used the production-derived Delta for the 1987 season.

Twincharging
The method of turbocharging and supercharging an engine is referred to as twincharging. The Delta S4 was the first example of this technology. The Delta S4 had a comparatively large Kühnle, Kopp & Kausch 27 turbocharger with a boost threshold of 4500 rpm. The turbo technology of the time had quite marked boost thresholds, with little or no response below this. Some people mistake this for turbo lag. This phenomenon, known as boost threshold, negatively affects driveability, an important aspect of any car. The Abarth Volumex R18 supercharger was the twin of the turbo, providing low to mid range boost and improving engine response and driveability of the S4. Superchargers do not suffer from lag as they are powered directly from the engine's crankshaft, rather than by the exhaust gases. However, because of this direct mechanical connection, the supercharger presents a significant parasitic load to the engine at higher engine speeds. Lancia designed their twincharger system so the supercharger provides instantaneous boost in the lower range, switching to the turbocharger for more efficient operation at higher engine speeds.

Delta S4 "Stradale"

Between October 1985 and 1986 Lancia, in keeping with Group B racing regulations, was to have built 200 of a road-going version of the Delta S4, officially named Lancia Delta S4 but widely known as "Stradale", for the purpose of homologation in Group B, but it is more likely that fewer than 100 were actually built. In Italy, the car was priced at about 100 million Lira: five times the price of the most expensive Delta of the time, the HF Turbo.

The Stradale's chassis was a space frame, similar to its rally counterpart, built out of CrMo steel tubes and aluminium alloy for the crash structures; it was covered by epoxy and fiberglass body panels. Like the rally car, the 1.8-litre four-cylinder engine was longitudinally mid-mounted, equipped with Weber-Marelli IAW integrated electronic ignition and fuel injection, a supercharger, a turbocharger and two intercoolers. The "Stradale" kept a three differential four-wheel-drive system from the rally car; the centre differential sent 30% of the engine torque to the front open differential, and 70% to the rear limited slip. The transmission remained a 5-speed but was a fully-synchronized unit built by CIMA.

In contrast to its bare bones racing sister, the S4 Stradale featured an Alcantara-upholstered interior, sound deadening, a suede steering wheel, and was equipped with power steering, trip computer and air conditioning. While racing versions were built by Abarth, the Stradales were built by Torinese coachbuilders .

Motorsport

In competition, the car won its first event, the 1985 RAC Rally in the hands of Henri Toivonen and carried Markku Alén to second in the drivers' championship the following year. For two weeks after the end of the 1986 season Alen was champion until the FIA annulled the results of the Sanremo Rally due to irregular technical scrutineering. Alén had won that event and the loss of points handed the title to Peugeot's Juha Kankkunen. All told, in 1986 there were three wins for the Delta S4 (San Remo not included). The Monte Carlo Rally by Toivonen, Rally Argentina by Massimo Biasion and the Olympus Rally by Alén. The car also won the 1986 European Rally Championship with Italian driver Fabrizio Tabaton, whose car was run by Italian team HF GRIFONE in ESSO livery. The factory supported Jolly Club team also ran cars in  livery, one of which was for Dario Cerrato. The car competed at every rally that year except for the extremely demanding and gruelling Safari Rally in Kenya, where Lancia decided that the Delta S4 was not developed enough for that event, so they decided to use the older 037 for Alen, Biasion and three local drivers who were regulars in the event.

The car's legacy was tainted by the fatal crash of Toivonen and co-driver Sergio Cresto on the 1986 Tour de Corse, where the Finnish driver inexplicably missed a tight left-hand hairpin bend and plunged into a ravine. The car burst into flames immediately, killing both of the crew. The accident led directly to the abolition of Group B.

WRC victories

Complete results in the World Rally Championship

References

External links
Henri Toivonen driving the S4
Antholonet entry on Delta S4
1m:49s video clips of Lancia Delta S4 en furie, from outside and in

Lancia rally cars
Abarth vehicles
Rally cars
Group B cars
1980s cars
Rear mid-engine, all-wheel-drive vehicles
Cars introduced in 1985